Haimre is a village in Märjamaa Parish, Rapla County in western Estonia. 

The manor in Haimre was owned by Alexander Rudolf Karl von Uexküll of the Uexküll family.

References

 

Villages in Rapla County
Kreis Wiek